Stuart Edwards (born 21 July 1972) is a former Australian rules footballer who played with Richmond in the Australian Football League (AFL).

Edwards played his early football at Haileybury and the Richmond Under-19s.

A forward, he kicked 26 goals for Richmond in 1995, from 14 games.

References

External links
 
 

1972 births
Australian rules footballers from Victoria (Australia)
Richmond Football Club players
Living people
People educated at Haileybury (Melbourne)